Samprati was the 5th Emperor of the Maurya dynasty. He was the son of 3rd Mauryan Emperor Ashoka's blind son, Kunala, and succeeded his cousin, 4th Mauryan Emperor Dasharatha, as emperor of the Maurya Empire. He built 1,50,000 Jain Derasars (Jainalaya/Jain Mandir/Jain Temple) and made 1,50,00,000 Jain idols. Also he was believed to have taken an oath to dig foundation of a new Jinalaya everyday and then only he used to do navakrashi (Jain breakfast).

Claim to throne
Samprati was grandson of Ashoka. Kunala was the son of one of Ashoka's queens, Padmavati (who was Jain), but was blinded in a conspiracy to remove his claim to the throne. Thus, Kunala was replaced by Dasharatha as the heir to the throne. Kunala lived in Ujjain with his "Dhai Maa". Samprati was brought up there. Years after being denied the throne, Kunala and Samprati approached Ashoka's court in an attempt to claim the throne. Ashoka could not deliver the throne to his blind son, but promised Samprati would be heir apparent after Dasharatha. After Dasharatha's death, Samprati inherited the throne of the Maurya Empire.

Reign
According to the Jain tradition he ruled for 53 years. The Jaina text  mentions that he ruled both from Pataliputra and Ujjain. According to a Jain text, the provinces of Saurashtra, Maharashtra, Andhra, and the Mysore region broke away from the empire shortly after Ashoka's death (i.e., during Dasharatha's reign), but were reconquered by Samprati, who later deployed soldiers disguised as Jain monks.

Samprati and Jainism
Samprati is regarded for his patronage and efforts to spread Jainism in east India. While in one source, he is described as nominally a Jain from birth (Sthaviravali 9.53), most accounts emphasize his conversion at the hands of the Jain monk Shri Suhastisuri, the eighth leader of the congregation established by Mahavira. After his conversion he was credited with actively spreading Jainism to many parts of India and beyond, both by making it possible for monks to travel to barbarian lands, and by building and renovating thousands of temples and establishing millions of idols. He was a disciple of Suhastisuriji.

Kalpa-sutra-bhashya mentions Samprati making regions of Andhra, Dravida, Maharashtra and Coorg safe for Jain monks.

In literature
Around 1100 CE Devachandrasuri of the Purnatalla Gaccha told the story of Samprati in his commentary on the Textbook on Fundamental Purity (Mulashuddhi Prakarana), in a chapter on the virtues of building temples. A century later, Amradevasuri of the Brihad Gaccha included the story of Samprati in his commentary to the Treasury of Stories (Akhyana Manikosha). In 1204, Malayaprabhasuri, a disciple of Manatungasuri of the Purnima Gaccha, wrote an extensive Prakrit commentary on his teacher's Deeds of Jayanti (Jayanti Carita), in which he included the story of Samprati as an example of the virtue of compassion (Caudhari 1973: 201-2). There are also some anonymous and undated medieval texts devoted solely to the story of Samprati, such as the 461-verse Sanskrit Deeds of King Samprati (Samprati Nripa Charitra).

Notes

Citations

Sources
 
 
 
 

Year of birth missing
Year of death missing
Mauryan emperors
3rd-century BC Indian Jains
3rd-century BC Indian monarchs
Jain monarchs